Mairinque is a municipality near Sorocaba, in the state of São Paulo in Brazil. It is part of the Metropolitan Region of Sorocaba. The population is 47,441 (2020 est.) in an area of 210.15 km². It is at an elevation of 850 m (2,955 ft). It is situated in the central part of the state of São Paulo, 70 km from the state capital.

Population history

Demographics

According to the 2000 IBGE Census, the population was 39,975, of which most, some 34,240, are urban and 5,635 are rural. The average life expectancy was 72.42 years. The literacy rate was at 92.79%.

Geography

The city's hinterland contains mountains and valleys.  Its climate is temperate and dry, with an average temperature of 18 °C.

Since the creation of an industrial park, the city has grown markedly, with a boom in activity in its public, private and social sectors. Urban change has been rapid, with considerable commercial development..

Many companies have head offices or regional offices in the city, including Cargill, Ibratele, Intertech, Agrosthal, Fiorella, Soldatopo, Chocolates Prink, Ferplast, Etrúria and Centrais de Estocagem Frigorificada (CEFRI).

History

First known as Vila Mayrink, the town grew around a railway junction. It is named after Francisco de Paula Mayrink, railway entrepreneur and politician in the First Brazilian Republic. It was part of the municipality of São Roque until it became a separate municipality under the name "Mairinque" in 1959.

Transportation

Mairinque is surrounded by several other cities, such as the port of Santos (153 km away), Campinas (114 km) and  Sorocaba (30 km). It is connected with São Paulo by two major highways, the Rodovia Raposo Tavares and Rodovia Castelo Branco. Several companies offer bus services to neighbouring cities.

References

External links
  About Mairinque
  Mairinque's website
  Mairinque on citybrazil.com.br

Municipalities in São Paulo (state)